The 1989 Memphis State Tigers football team represented Memphis State University (now known as the University of Memphis) as an independent in the 1989 NCAA Division I-A football season. The team was led by fifth-year head coach Chuck Stobart and played their home games at the Liberty Bowl Memorial Stadium in Memphis, Tennessee.

Schedule

References

Memphis
Memphis Tigers football seasons
Memphis Tigers football